Michelle Hartman is an American author and poet. Born in Fort Worth in 1956, she attended Texas Wesleyan College (now University) in the early 1970s. Her major was Political Science until she dropped out of school. She finished her bachelor's degree in 2007, with a major in Political Science Pre-Law. After receiving a Certificate in Paralegal Studies from Tarrant County College, she worked as a paralegal. She began writing poetry of political and social satire using fairy tales as a vehicle. Her first book, Disenchanted and Disgruntled, was published by Lamar University Literary Press in 2013.

Her work has been featured in The Galway Review and The Langdon Review of the Arts in Texas published by Tarleton State University. Her work has also appeared in journals in Australia, Ireland, Canada, Germany, Sweden and Nepal.

Hartman is the former editor (2010-2018) of the international journal Red River Review. She has read at Southwest literary festivals such as Scissortail Literary Festival in Oklahoma, Langdon Review Weekend and the ASU Writers Conference in Honor of Elmer Kelton, among others.

Bibliography 
 Disenchanted and Disgruntled, Lamar University Press, 2013
 Irony and Irreverence, Lamar University Press, 2015
 The Lost Journal of My Second Trip to Purgatory, Old Seventy Creek Press, 2016
There Are No Doors, El Grito del Lobo Press, (Chapbook) 2017
Wanton Disarray, Hungry Buzzard Press, 2019
First Night, Red Flag Press, 2019
Here Be Doors, Dancing Girl Press, 2019

Honors and awards 
 Named Distinguished Alumni by Tarrant County College
Two Pushcart Nominations (Canada and US)
 Juried Poet - Houston Poetry Fest Competition
 Phi Theta Kappa, National Honor Society
 Pi Gamma Mu, International Honor Society of the Social Sciences
 Pi Sigma Alpha, National Political Science Honor Society
 2004 – Dannon “Strike Out Hunger” Award

References

External links 
 Review of Michelle Hartman’s Disenchanted and Disgruntled
 Poets and Writers - Directory of Writers - Michelle Hartman
 Michelle Hartman Interview With Alok Mishra
 Lamar University Press: Irony and Irreverence by Michelle Hartman
 Texas Wesleyan University: Mitchell-Reed Community of Learners presents poetry session Oct. 27, 2015
 TCEA Breakfast Speaker: Michelle Hartman - "Writing Humor in the State of Texas" - March 7, 2015
 Review of The Lost Journal of My Second Trip to Purgatory by British reviewer Christopher Barnes, Lummox 7
Houston Chronicle, What is left - September 15, 2018
Interview with Lonestar Literary Life - April 4, 2016
A Virtual Interview with Michelle Hartman, Huyser, Cindy - March 6, 2017
Pasatiempo: "Two peas in a pod article about reading", Levin, Jennifer - August 4, 2017

Living people
1956 births
Poets from Texas
American women poets
21st-century American poets
21st-century American women writers